Cyclone Cavalier is a 1925 American silent Western film directed by Albert S. Rogell and starring Reed Howes, Carmelita Geraghty, and Wilfred Lucas.

Plot
As described in a film magazine review, a young man whose adventurousness keeps him in trouble is sent to a small South American republic by his wealthy father. En route he meets and falls in love with the daughter of the president of the state to which she is going. He aids her father in stifling a revolution and wins the young woman’s hand in marriage.

Cast

References

Bibliography
 Pitts, Michael R. (2012). Western Movies: A Guide to 5,105 Feature Films. McFarland.

External links

 
 

1925 films
1925 Western (genre) films
Films directed by Albert S. Rogell
1920s English-language films
Rayart Pictures films
American black-and-white films
Silent American Western (genre) films
1920s American films